The Whangārei volcanic field (Puhipuhi-Whangarei volcanic field) is an area of intra-plate monogenetic volcanism located near the city of Whangārei, North Island, New Zealand. It was last active between 260,000 to 319,000 years ago  and continues to be potentially active as a low-velocity seismic zone in the crust exists beneath Whangārei, which is interpreted to be a body of partial melt. This mantle source has been coupled to the lithosphere for about 8 million years. As the field has potentially been active at low frequency for millions of years, with 100,000 years or more between events it might best be regarded as dormant. The recent vents active in the last million years include some dacite in composition. Composition details are freely available for most of the field but many vents do not have ages.

Geology

Volcanics
These volcanoes are part of the eastern Northland volcanic belt which includes the monogenetic Kaikohe-Bay of Islands volcanic field and the volcanoes of the Whangārei Heads and the Hen of the Hen and Chickens Islands which are not part of the field. Rather the volcanoes of the Whangārei Heads are usually related to the now extinct predominantly andesitic Taurikura volcanic complex and its caldera, although the close proximity, overlap in time, and dacite eruptive centres possibly reflects a continuum.

Non-volcanics and Tectonics
The hilly landscape to the west of Whangārei is from uplifted Waipapa Terrane greywacke deposits from ocean floor sediments first laid down several hundred millions ago off the coast of Gondwanaland. There are some coal measures, sandstone, and limestone from late Eocene and Oligocene (Te Kuiti Group) sediments laid on top of the greywacke basement. On top of these contributing to many hills are often more clay like deposits  originally from the floor of the Pacific Ocean of 80-25 million years ago. About 25 million years ago these deep-sea sediments were uplifted as the Northland Allochthon. There are no known active faults in Northland Historic faults are believed, due to volcanic alignment, to have been permissive to the surface volcanism of the last 25 million years, with the Whangārei Harbour fault being a prominent example.

List of volcanoes

References

Volcanism of New Zealand
Landforms of the Northland Region
 
Whangarei District
Volcanoes of the Northland Region